David "Samwimbila" Chingunji (born in 1945, died in 1970) served as a top commander in the National Union for the Total Independence of Angola (UNITA), who became pro-Western rebels in the subsequent Angolan Civil War (1975–2002). David Chingunji was the nephew of Tito Chingunji, served as the foreign secretary of Angola's UNITA rebel movement in the 1980s and early 1990s.

Death and aftermath
Chingunji died when UNITA forces tried to ambush Portuguese forces in 1970. Some said UNITA leader Jonas Savimbi, fearing a competitor for control of UNITA, ordered Chingunji's assassination, alleging Chingunji had opposed the planned ambush but Savimbi insisted. Some witnesses say non-Portuguese killers shot Chingunji in the back.

He had trained in the People's Republic of China and the Chinese government openly named him as a possible successor to Savimbi. All of his brothers, with the exception of Dinho, died in mysterious circumstances. Twenty one years later Tito Chingunji was also murdered in Angola (which is the same place where his nephew David was murdered) in 1991 under circumstances that are still not fully understood.

See also
List of unsolved murders

References

1945 births
1970 crimes in Angola
1970 deaths
1970 murders in Africa
1970s murders in Angola
20th-century Angolan people
Angolan rebels
Angolan revolutionaries
Angolan warlords
Assassinated Angolan politicians
Deaths by firearm in Angola
Male murder victims
Members of UNITA
People murdered in Angola
Unsolved murders in Angola